Bugula is a genus of common colonial arborescent bryozoa, often mistaken for seaweed. It commonly grows upright in bushy colonies of up to 15 cm in height.

Distribution
The native distribution of Bugula neritina is presumed to be tropical and subtropical waters; however, it has become widespread globally due to attachment to the hulls of vessels. It is considered an invasive species in some countries.

Bugula neritina

Bugula neritina attracted interest as a source of cytotoxic chemicals, bryostatins, under clinical investigation as anti-cancer agents. It was first collected and provided to JL Hartwell's anticancer drug discovery group at the National Cancer Institute (NCI) by Jack Rudloe. In 2001 pharmaceutical company GPC Biotech licensed Bryostatin 1 from Arizona State University for commercial development as a treatment for cancer. GPC Biotech canceled development in 2003, saying that Bryostatin 1 showed little effectiveness and some toxic side-effects. More recent work shows it has positive effects on cognition in sufferers of Alzheimers with few side effects.

Other uses
Dried Bugula are commonly used as decorations:
"Air fern", the so-called everlasting plant that supposedly absorbs from air all the moisture it needs to live, is commonly dried colonies of the bryozoan Bugula that have been artificially coloured.

However, Sertularia argentea are also sold as "air ferns."

Species

 Bugula alba Vieira, Winston & Fehlauer-Ale, 2012
 Bugula apsteini Hasenbank, 1932
 Bugula aspinosa Liu, 1984
 Bugula biota Vieira, Winston & Fehlauer-Ale, 2012
 Bugula capensis Waters, 1887
 Bugula ceylonensis Winston & Woollacott, 2008
 Bugula crosslandi Hastings, 1939
 Bugula decipiens Hayward, 1981
 Bugula expansa Hastings, 1939
 Bugula fastigiata Kluge, 1929
 Bugula gautieri Ryland, 1962
 Bugula gnoma Vieira, Winston & Fehlauer-Ale, 2012
 Bugula hessei Hasenbank, 1932
 Bugula hummelincki Fransen, 1986
 Bugula ingens Vieira, Winston & Fehlauer-Ale, 2012
 Bugula intermedia Liu, 1984
 Bugula longissima  Busk, 1884
 Bugula lophodendron Ortmann, 1890
 Bugula migottoi Vieira, Winston & Fehlauer-Ale, 2012
 Bugula miniatella Winston & Woollacott, 2008
 Bugula minima Waters, 1909
 Bugula neritina (Linnaeus, 1758)
 Bugula neritinoides Hastings, 1939
 Bugula orientalis Liu, 1984
 Bugula paternostrae Winston & Woollacott, 2008
 Bugula philippsae Harmer, 1926
 Bugula prismatica (Gray, 1843)
 Bugula protensa Hayward, 1981
 Bugula providensis Winston & Woollacott, 2008
 Bugula robusta MacGillivray, 1869
 Bugula robustoides Winston & Woollacott, 2008
 Bugula rochae Vieira, Winston & Fehlauer-Ale, 2012
 Bugula scaphoides Kirkpatrick, 1890
 Bugula scaphula Tilbrook, Hayward & Gordon, 2001
 Bugula simpliciformis Osburn, 1932
 Bugula solorensis Winston & Woollacott, 2008
 Bugula subglobosa Harmer, 1926
 Bugula tschukotkensis Kluge, 1952
 Bugula umbelliformis Yanagi & Okada, 1918
 Bugula vectifera Harmer, 1926

Species brought into synonymy
 Bugula angustiloba (Lamarck, 1816): synonym of Bugulina angustiloba (Lamarck, 1816)
 Bugula aperta (Hincks, 1886): synonym of Crisularia aperta (Hincks, 1886)
 Bugula aquilirostris Ryland, 1960: synonym of Bugulina aquilirostris (Ryland, 1960)
 Bugula avicularia (Linnaeus, 1758): synonym of Bugulina avicularia (Linnaeus, 1758)
 Bugula bengalensis Rao & Ganapati, 1974: synonym of Crisularia bengalensis (Rao & Ganapati, 1974)
 Bugula bicornis Busk, 1884: synonym of Camptoplites bicornis (Busk, 1884)
 Bugula borealis (Packard, 1863): synonym of Bugulina borealis (Packard, 1863)
 Bugula bowiei Vieira, Winston & Fehlauer-Ale, 2012: synonym of Crisularia bowiei (Vieira, Winston & Fehlauer-Ale, 2012)
 Bugula calathus Norman, 1868: synonym of Bugulina calathus (Norman, 1868)
 Bugula californica Robertson, 1905: synonym of Bugulina californica (Robertson, 1905)
 Bugula carvalhoi Marcus, 1949: synonym of Bugulina carvalhoi (Marcus, 1949)
 Bugula cucullata Busk, 1867: synonym of Crisularia cucullata (Busk, 1867)
 Bugula cucullifera Osburn, 1912: synonym of Crisularia cucullifera (Osburn, 1912)
 Bugula cuspidata Hastings, 1943: synonym of Crisularia cuspidata (Hastings, 1943)
 Bugula dentata (Lamouroux, 1816): synonym of Virididentula dentata (Lamouroux, 1816)
 Bugula dispar Harmer, 1926: synonym of Crisularia dispar (Harmer, 1926)
 Bugula ditrupae Busk, 1858: synonym of Bugulina ditrupae (Busk, 1858)
 Bugula eburnea Calvet, 1906: synonym of Bugulina eburnea (Calvet, 1906)
 Bugula elongata Nordgaard, 1906: synonym of Dendrobeania decorata (Verrill, 1879)
 Bugula flabellata (Thompson, in Gray, 1848): synonym of Bugulina flabellata (Thompson, in Gray, 1848)
 Bugula foliolata Vieira, Winston & Fehlauer-Ale, 2012: synonym of Bugulina foliolata (Vieira, Winston & Fehlauer-Ale, 2012)
 Bugula fulva Ryland, 1960: synonym of Bugulina fulva (Ryland, 1960)
 Bugula germanae (Calvet, 1902): synonym of Bugula serrata (Lamarck, 1816): synonym of Crisularia serrata (Lamarck, 1816)
 Bugula gracilis Busk, 1858: synonym of Crisularia gracilis (Busk, 1858)
 Bugula grayi Maturo, 1966: synonym of Crisularia grayi (Maturo, 1966)
 Bugula guara Vieira, Winston & Fehlauer-Ale, 2012: synonym of Crisularia guara (Vieira, Winston & Fehlauer-Ale, 2012)
 Bugula harmsworthi Waters, 1900: synonym of Crisularia harmsworthi (Waters, 1900)
 Bugula hyadesi Jullien, 1888: synonym of Crisularia hyadesi (Jullien, 1888)
 Bugula japonica: synonym of Dendrobeania japonica (Ortmann, 1890)
 Bugula johnstonae (Gray, 1843): synonym of Halophila johnstonae Gray, 1843
 Bugula leontodon Busk, 1884: synonym of Himantozoum leontodon (Busk, 1884)
 Bugula longicauda Harmer, 1926: synonym of Halophila longicauda (Busk, 1884)
 Bugula longirostrata Robertson, 1905: synonym of Bugulina longirostrata (Robertson, 1905)
 Bugula marcusi Maturo, 1966: synonym of Crisularia marcusi (Maturo, 1966)
 Bugula margaritifera Busk, 1884: synonym of Himantozoum margaritifera (Busk, 1884): synonym of Himantozoum margaritiferum (Busk, 1884)
 Bugula microoecia Osburn, 1914: synonym of Crisularia microoecia (Osburn, 1914)
 Bugula mirabilis Busk, 1884: synonym of Himantozoum mirabilis (Busk, 1884)
 Bugula mollis Harmer, 1926: synonym of Crisularia mollis (Harmer, 1926)
 Bugula multiserialis (d'Orbigny, 1841): synonym of Bugulina multiserialis (d'Orbigny, 1841)
 Bugula nana Androsova, 1977: synonym of Crisularia nana (Androsova, 1977)
 Bugula pacifica Robertson, 1905: synonym of Crisularia pacifica (Robertson, 1905)
 Bugula pedata Harmer, 1926: synonym of Bugulina pedata (Harmer, 1926)
 Bugula plumosa (Pallas, 1766): synonym of Crisularia plumosa (Pallas, 1766)
 Bugula prenanti Castric-Fey, 1971: synonym of Crisularia prenanti (Castric-Fey, 1971)
 Bugula pugeti Robertson, 1905: synonym of Bugulina pugeti (Robertson, 1905)
 Bugula purpurotincta Norman, 1868: synonym of Crisularia purpurotincta (Norman, 1868)
 Bugula reticulata Busk, 1884: synonym of Camptoplites reticulatus (Busk, 1884)
 Bugula rylandi Maturo, 1966: synonym of Crisularia rylandi (Maturo, 1966)
 Bugula serrata (Lamarck, 1816): synonym of Crisularia serrata (Lamarck, 1816)
 Bugula simplex Hincks, 1886: synonym of Bugulina simplex (Hincks, 1886)
 Bugula sinuosa Busk, 1884: synonym of Himantozoum sinuosum (Busk, 1884)
 Bugula spicata (Hincks, 1886): synonym of Bugulina spicata (Hincks, 1886)
 Bugula stolonifera Ryland, 1960: synonym of Bugulina stolonifera (Ryland, 1960)
 Bugula tricuspis Kluge, 1955: synonym of Bugulina tricuspis (Kluge, 1955)
 Bugula turbinata Alder, 1857: synonym of Bugulina turbinata (Alder, 1857)
 Bugula turrita (Desor, 1848): synonym of Crisularia turrita (Desor, 1848)
 Bugula versicolor Busk, 1884: synonym of Semidendrobeania versicolor (Busk, 1884)

References

 Costello, M.J. et al. (Ed.) (2001). European register of marine species: a check-list of the marine species in Europe and a bibliography of guides to their identification. Collection Patrimoines Naturels, 50: pp. 325–333
 Fehlauer-Ale, Karin H., Winston, Judith E., Tilbrook, Kevin J., Nascimento, Karine B. & Vieira, Leandro M. (2015). Identifying monophyletic groups within Bugula sensu lato (Bryozoa, Buguloidea). Zoologica Scripta

External links
Smithsonian Marine Station at Fort Pierce
Introduced Marine Species of Hawai'i
Exotics Guide - Bugula neritina

Bryozoan genera
Cheilostomatida